The 1979–80 season was the North American Soccer League's first ever full indoor soccer season with playoffs. It began in November 1979, and the championship occurred in March 1980.

Overview
Only 10 of the 24 NASL member-teams chose to field a squad for the 12 game regular season and 6 team, 3 round playoffs. The league decided to make several rule modifications from the NASL indoor tournaments and indoor friendlies of previous years. The most obvious change was the goal. No longer 4 by 16 feet (h x w), the goals now measured a more proportionate 6.5 by 12, with a board or plexiglass panel above the cross bar instead of netting. Rather than being divided into three 20-minute periods (like hockey) as was done previously, or the more recent three 15-minute periods, the game now featured four 15-minute quarters with an extended halftime (similar to American football) and short breaks and the end of the first and third quarters. These modifications were consistent with the rules of the competing Major Indoor Soccer League, which had begun operation in December 1978. Other changes included an extra referee at the bench to keep track of time penalties. Like most American sports, the clock would count down to 00:00 rather than up to "full time" as was done in association football. As before, (like ice hockey) there would be free substitutions, but players now had to touch the wall by their bench before a substitute player could come onto the playing floor. The floor dimensions remained, more or less 200 by 85 feet. Golden goal/sudden death overtime was used to settle games tied at the end of regulation. In the playoffs, 15-minute mini-games were used to decide series that were tied at one victory apiece. Indeed, two playoff series, including the Championship Final between Tampa Bay and Memphis, would need to be settled by means of a mini-game.

Regular season
W = Wins, L = Losses, GB = Games Behind 1st Place, % = Winning Percentage, GF = Goals For, GA = Goals Against, Avg Att = Average Home Attendance

Regular season statistics

Scoring leaders
GP = Games Played, G = Goals (worth 2 points), A = Assists (worth 1 point), Pts = Points

Leading goalkeepers
Note: GP = Games played; Min = Minutes played; Svs = Saves; GA = Goals against; GAA = Goals against average; W = Wins

Playoffs

Bracket

1st round

Division Finals
If a playoff series is tied after two games, a 15 minute, tie breaker mini-game is played.

Championship finals

*Memphis Rogues hosted Game 1 (instead of Game 2 and Mini-game) due to scheduling conflicts at the Mid-South Coliseum.

Championship match reports

1979–80 NASL Indoor Champions: Tampa Bay Rowdies

References

NASL Indoor Season, 1979-80
NASL Indoor Season, 1979-80
1980 in American soccer
NASL Indoor seasons
1980
Soccer in Florida